Ramon Humbert (1 January 1939 – 22 April 2003) was a Luxembourgian sprinter. He competed in the men's 4 × 400 metres relay at the 1960 Summer Olympics.

References

1939 births
2003 deaths
Athletes (track and field) at the 1960 Summer Olympics
Luxembourgian male sprinters
Olympic athletes of Luxembourg
Sportspeople from Esch-sur-Alzette